Hitkillers/The Beast of Claw Boys Claw is a compilation album by Dutch rock and roll band Claw Boys Claw. The album, released on CD only, combines their fourth studio album Hitkillers (released only on vinyl) and a selection of earlier songs, re-recorded and remixed.

Track listing

Personnel

John Cameron - guitar (lead vocal on "Let Your Hair Hang Down")
Pete TeBos - vocals
Bobbie Rossini - bass, backing vocals
Marius Schrader - drums, backing vocals
Hans Dulfer - saxophone ("Ruby Is The One")
Tineke Schoenmaker - backing vocals ("Ruby Is The One," "Back Home")
Herman Brood - piano ("Let Your Hair Hang Down," "Down Man")
Jaap van Beusekom - banjo ("Mississippi")
John Legrand - harmonica ("Appleknockers Flophouse," "Back Home")
Cor Witjes - accordion ("Russian Spy and I")
Allard Jolles - producer
Frank van der Weij - mix, engineering (tracks 1-10)
Michiel Jansen - engineering (tracks 11-21)
Henk Temming - mix ("Down Man," "In The Dutch Mountains," Appleknockers Flophouse")

Recording
Hitkillers (tracks 1-10) recorded at Orkater Studios, Amsterdam; mixed at Zeezicht Studios
The Beast of Claw Boys Claw (tracks 11-21) re-recorded and mixed at SPN Studios, Amsterdam

References

See also
Claw Boys Claw discography

Claw Boys Claw albums
1988 compilation albums